Yetkin Dikinciler (born 15 August 1969) is a Turkish actor.

Biography
Yetkin Dikinciler graduated in Theatre from the State Conservatory of Mimar Sinan University.
He was awarded "Best Actor" for his role as Nazım Hikmet in Mavi Gözlü Dev at the 19th Ankara Film Festival, 13th ÇASOD Awards and 13th Sadri Alışık Awards.

Filmography 
 Hot Skull (2022)
 Barbaroslar: Akdeniz'in Kılıcı (2021) - İshak Reis
 Yeşilçam (2021) - Reha
 Menajerimi Ara (2020) - Himself
 Merhaba Güzel Vatanım (Batı İstanbul Vakfı) (2019)
 Cep Herkülü: Naim Süleymanoğlu (Dijital Yapım Evi) (2019)
 Bahtiyar Ölmez (2017-2018) - Rıfat Çakar/Bahtiyar Ölmez
 Her Şey Mümkün (2017) - İbrahim/Selim
 Nadide Hayat (2015) - Kaptan Yusuf
 Kızım İçin (2013) - Tuncer
 Muhteşem Yüzyıl (2014) - Kara Ahmed Pasha
 Umut Üzümleri (Rönesans Film) (2013) - Ozan
 Merhaba Hayat (2012) - Sinan
 Çıplak Gerçek (2012)
 Bizim Yenge (2011) - Adem
 Umut Yolcuları (2010) - Mehmet Müdür
 Aile Saadeti (2009) - Selim Pasha
 Usta : Bahadır Karataş (2008) - Doğan
 Kara İnci (2007) - Semih
 Mavi Gözlü Dev : Biket İlhan - (2007) - Nâzım Hikmet
 Ulak : Çağan Irmak - (2007) - Adem
 Eşref Saati : Zeynep Günay Tan - (2007) - Sarı Eşref
 Kabuslar Evi: "Son Dans" : Çağan Irmak - (2006) - Selim
 Sis ve Gece : Turgut Yasalar - (2006) - Fahri
 Gözyaşı Çetesi : (2006) - Cevahir
 Babam ve Oğlum : Çağan Irmak - (2005) - Salim
 Misi (2005) - Onur
 Radyo Tantana (2005) - Kenan
 The Net 2.0 : (2005) - Banka Müdürü
 Kırık Kanatlar (2005) - guest appearance
 Gülizar (2004) - İsmail
 Üç Kişilik Aşk (2004) - Cem
 Avrupa Yakası : Hakan Algül - (2004) - guest appearance
 Seni Yaşatacağım : (2003) - Reşat
 Leoparın Kuyruğu : Turgut Yasalar - (1998) - Serdar

References

External links
 

1969 births
Living people
Male actors from Istanbul
Turkish male film actors
Turkish male television actors
Turkish male stage actors
Mimar Sinan Fine Arts University alumni